Mara Viveros Vigoya (born 1956) is a Colombian academic.

Life 

Vigoya was born in Cali, Colombia on February 6, 1956. She studied at the Lycée Français Paul Valéry de Cali and received her PhD in Anthropology at the Ecole des Hautes Etudes en Sciences Sociales in Paris (EHESS).

She is a professor at the Department of Anthropology and the School of Gender Studies at the Universidad Nacional de Colombia in Bogota, Colombia where she has taught and conducted research since 1998. She is also the co-director of Research Group "Interdisciplinary Group for Gender Studies".

She has participated as a member of the School of Social Science at the Institute for Advanced Studies in Princeton (NJ) and has been invited, at the Institut des Hautes Etudes sur l’Amérique Latine (IHEAL) and the EHESS of Paris, the Federal University of Bahia in Brazil and the Center for Gender Studies (CALAS) at the Universidad de Guadalajara and UAM-Xochimilco (Mexico).  She was the president of the Latin American Studies Association.

Her research interests include issues related to the relationship between social differences and inequalities, and intersections of gender, sexuality, class, race and ethnicity in the social dynamics of Latin American societies. She has published on these subjects.

Published works

Books (as author, coauthor and editor) 
2001 - Cuerpo, Differencias y Desigualdades (Spanish Edition); Mara Viveros Vigoya (Author); Gloria Garay Ariza (Author); Universidad Externado de Colombia
2006 - Discursos sobre el colonialismo (Cuestiones De Antagonismo/ Antagonism Matters); Aimé Césaire (Author), Beñat Baltza Álvarez, Juan Mari Madariaga, Mara Viveros Vigoya (Translators); Ediciones Akal
2008 - Raza, etnicidad y sexualidades. Ciudadanía y multiculturalismo; Mara Viveros Vigoya,  Peter Wade and  Fernando Urrea Giraldo (Editors); Universidad Nacional de Colombia
2013 - Saberes culturales y derechos sexuales en Colombia; Mara Viveros Vigoya (Author), Tercer Mundo Editores
2019 - Antropología y feminismo; Alhena Caicedo, Lila Abu-Lughod, Mara Viveros Vigoya, Diana Gómez Correal, Diana Ojeda;  Asociación Colombiana de Antropología (ACANT)

Monographs (selection) 
2021. El oxímoron de las clases medias negras. Movilidad social e interseccionalidad en Colombia. Guadalajara / Bielefeld / San José / Quito / Bueno Aires: CALAS.
2018. Les couleurs de la Masculinité. Expériences intersectionnelles et pratiques de pouvoir, en: Amérique Latine, Paris : Editions la Découverte.
2018. As cores da masculinidade Experiências interseccionais e práticas de poder na Nossa América, Rio de Janeiro: Papéis Selvagens.

Articles / Chapters (selection) 

2018. "Race, Indigeneity and Gender: Colombian Feminism Learning, Lessons for Global Feminism". En: James W Messerschmidt, Patricia Yancey Martin, Michael A. Messner & Raewyn Connell (eds.), Gender Reckonings. New Social Theory and Research, New York: New York University Press, pp. 90–110.
2018. "De la extraversión a las epistemologías nuestramericanas: Un descentramiento en clave feminista". En: Santiago Gómez Obando, Catherine Moore Torres y Leopoldo Múnera Ruiz (coords.): Los saberes múltiples y las ciencias sociales y políticas, Bogotá, Universidad Nacional de Colombia, pp. 171–192.
2017. Viveros, Mara y Oyeronke Oyewumi: "La invención de las mujeres. Una perspectiva africana sobre los discursos occidentales del género. Bogotá: en la Frontera".  En: Revista LiminaR, Estudios Sociales y Humanísticos, 16 (1). 2013–2206.
2017. "Intersecciones, periferias y heterotopías en las cartografías de la sexualidad". En: Sexualidad, Salud y Sociedad. Revista Latinoamericana, 27. 220–241.
2017. "Les études de genre et les mouvements ethnico-raciaux en Colombie. Entre méfiances et défis, en: Régions & Cohésion, 7 (3). 95-110.
2017. Mra Viveros y Luz Gabriela Arango Gaviria. "Los estudios feministas y de género: un campo de pensamiento y transformación social". En: Estela Restrepo Zea, Clara Helena Sánchez, Gustavo Silva Carrero (coords): Economía, Lenguaje, Trabajo y Sociedad, tomo 2.3. 156–183.
2016. "La interseccionalidad: una aproximación situada a la dominación". En: Debate Feminista.1-17. 
2016. "Masculinities in the continuum of violence in Latin America". En: Feminist Theory, 17 (2). 229–237. 
2016. "Blanqueamiento social, nación y moralidad en América Latina". En: Messeder, Suely, Mary Garcia Castro y Laura Moutinho (coords.): Enlaçando Sexualidades. Uma tesitura interdisciplinar no reino das sexualidades e das relaçoes de gênero, Salvador, Bahia: Edufba. 17–39. 
2015. "Social Mobility, Whiteness, and Whitening in Colombia" En: The Journal of Latin American and Caribbean Anthropology, 20 (3). 496–512.
2015. "L’intersectionnalité au prisme du féminisme latinoaméricain". En: Raisons Politiques, (58). 39–54.
2015. "Sex/Gender". En: Lisa Disch and Mary Hawkesworth (coords.): The Oxford Handbook of Feminist Theory, Oxford: Oxford University Press. 852–874.
2015. "The sexual erotic market as an analytical framework for understanding erotic-affective exchanges in interracial sexually intimate and affective relationships". En: Culture, Health & Sexuality, 17 (1). 1–13.
2014. "Con Lesmes Sergio. Cuestiones raciales y construcción de Nación en tiempos de multiculturalismo". En: Universitas Humanistica, (77). 13–31.
2013. "Género, raza y nación. Los réditos políticos de la masculinidad blanca". En: Maguaré, 27 (1). 71–104.

References

Colombian academics
Colombian anthropologists
Colombian women
Colombian women anthropologists
1956 births
Living people